In particle physics, CP violation is a violation of CP-symmetry (or charge conjugation parity symmetry): the combination of C-symmetry (charge symmetry) and P-symmetry (parity symmetry). CP-symmetry states that the laws of physics should be the same if a particle is interchanged with its antiparticle (C-symmetry) while its spatial coordinates are inverted ("mirror" or P-symmetry). The discovery of CP violation in 1964 in the decays of neutral kaons resulted in the Nobel Prize in Physics in 1980 for its discoverers James Cronin and Val Fitch.

It plays an important role both in the attempts of cosmology to explain the dominance of matter over antimatter in the present universe, and in the study of weak interactions in particle physics.

Overview
Until the 1950s, parity conservation was believed to be one of the fundamental geometric conservation laws (along with conservation of energy and conservation of momentum). After the discovery of parity violation in 1956, CP-symmetry was proposed to restore order. However, while the strong interaction and electromagnetic interaction seem to be invariant under the combined CP transformation operation, further experiments showed that this symmetry is slightly violated during certain types of weak decay.

Only a weaker version of the symmetry could be preserved by physical phenomena, which was CPT symmetry. Besides C and P, there is a third operation, time reversal T, which corresponds to reversal of motion.  Invariance under time reversal implies that whenever a motion is allowed by the laws of physics, the reversed motion is also an allowed one and occurs at the same rate forwards and backwards. 

The combination of CPT is thought to constitute an exact symmetry of all types of fundamental interactions.  Because of the long-held CPT symmetry theorem, provided that it is valid, a violation of the CP-symmetry is equivalent to a violation of the T-symmetry. In this theorem, regarded as one of the basic principles of quantum field theory, charge conjugation, parity, and time reversal are applied together. Direct observation of the time reversal symmetry violation without any assumption of CPT theorem was done in 1998 by two groups, CPLEAR and KTeV collaborations, at CERN and Fermilab, respectively. Already in 1970 Klaus Schubert observed T violation independent of assuming CPT symmetry by using the Bell–Steinberger unitarity relation.

History

P-symmetry
The idea behind parity symmetry was that the equations of particle physics are invariant under mirror inversion. This led to the prediction that the mirror image of a reaction (such as a chemical reaction or radioactive decay) occurs at the same rate as the original reaction. However, in 1956 a careful critical review of the existing experimental data by theoretical physicists Tsung-Dao Lee and Chen-Ning Yang revealed that while parity conservation had been verified in decays by the strong or electromagnetic interactions, it was untested in the weak interaction. They proposed several possible direct experimental tests. 

The first test based on beta decay of cobalt-60 nuclei was carried out in 1956 by a group led by Chien-Shiung Wu, and demonstrated conclusively that weak interactions violate the P-symmetry or, as the analogy goes, some reactions did not occur as often as their mirror image. However, parity symmetry still appears to be valid for all reactions involving electromagnetism and strong interactions.

CP-symmetry
Overall, the symmetry of a quantum mechanical system can be restored if another approximate symmetry S can be found such that the combined symmetry PS remains unbroken.  This rather subtle point about the structure of Hilbert space was realized shortly after the discovery of P violation, and it was proposed that charge conjugation, C, which transforms a particle into its antiparticle, was the  suitable symmetry to restore order.

In 1956 Reinhard Oehme in a letter to Yang and shortly after, Ioffe, Okun and Rudik showed that the parity violation meant that charge conjugation invariance must also be violated in weak decays.
Charge violation was confirmed in the Wu experiment and in experiments performed by Valentine Telegdi and Jerome Friedman and Garwin and Lederman who observed parity non-conservation in pion and muon decay and found that C is also violated. Charge violation was more explicitly shown in experiments done by John Riley Holt at the University of Liverpool.  

Oehme then wrote a paper with Lee and Yang in which they discussed the interplay of non-invariance under P, C and T. The same result was also independently obtained by B.L. Ioffe, Okun and A.P. Rudik. Both groups also discussed possible CP violations in neutral kaon decays.

Lev Landau proposed in 1957 CP-symmetry, often called just CP as the true symmetry between matter and antimatter. CP-symmetry is the product of two transformations: C for charge conjugation and P for parity. In other words, a process in which all particles are exchanged with their antiparticles was assumed to be equivalent to the mirror image of the original process and so the combined CP-symmetry would be conserved in the weak interaction.

In 1962, a group of experimentalists at Dubna, on Okun's insistence, unsuccessfully searched for CP-violating kaon decay.

Experimental status

Indirect CP violation
In 1964, James Cronin, Val Fitch and coworkers provided clear evidence from kaon decay that CP-symmetry could be broken. This work won them the 1980 Nobel Prize. This discovery showed that weak interactions violate not only the charge-conjugation symmetry C between particles and antiparticles and the P or parity, but also their combination. The discovery shocked particle physics and opened the door to questions still at the core of particle physics and of cosmology today. The lack of an exact CP-symmetry, but also the fact that it is so close to a symmetry, introduced a great puzzle.

The kind of CP violation discovered in 1964 was linked to the fact that neutral kaons can transform into their antiparticles (in which each quark is replaced with the other's antiquark) and vice versa, but such transformation does not occur with exactly the same probability in both directions; this is called indirect CP violation.

Direct CP violation

Despite many searches, no other manifestation of CP violation was discovered until the 1990s, when the NA31 experiment at CERN suggested evidence for CP violation in the decay process of the very same neutral kaons (direct CP violation). The observation was somewhat controversial, and final proof for it came in 1999 from the KTeV experiment at Fermilab and the NA48 experiment at CERN.

Starting in 2001, a new generation of experiments, including the BaBar experiment at the Stanford Linear Accelerator Center (SLAC) and the Belle Experiment at the High Energy Accelerator Research Organisation (KEK) in Japan, observed direct CP violation in a different system, namely in decays of the B mesons. A large number of CP violation processes in B meson decays have now been discovered. Before these "B-factory" experiments, there was a logical possibility that all CP violation was confined to kaon physics. However, this raised the question of why CP violation did not extend to the strong force, and furthermore, why this was not predicted by the unextended Standard Model, despite the model's accuracy for "normal" phenomena.

In 2011, a hint of CP violation in decays of neutral D mesons was reported by the LHCb experiment at CERN using 0.6 fb−1 of Run 1 data. However, the same measurement using the full 3.0 fb−1 Run 1 sample was consistent with CP-symmetry.

In 2013 LHCb announced discovery of CP violation in strange B meson decays.

In March 2019, LHCb announced discovery of CP violation in charmed  decays with a deviation from zero of 5.3 standard deviations.

In 2020, the T2K Collaboration reported some indications of CP violation in leptons for the first time.
In this experiment, beams of muon neutrinos and muon antineutrinos were alternately produced by an accelerator. By the time they got to the detector, a significantly higher proportion of electron neutrinos were detected from the  beams, than electron antineutrinos were from the  beams. The results were not yet precise enough to determine the size of the CP violation, relative to that seen in quarks. In addition, another similar experiment, NOvA sees no evidence of CP violation in neutrino oscillations and is in slight tension with T2K.

CP violation in the Standard Model
"Direct" CP violation is allowed in the Standard Model if a complex phase appears in the CKM matrix describing quark mixing, or the PMNS matrix describing neutrino mixing. A necessary condition for the appearance of the complex phase is the presence of at least three generations of fermions. If fewer generations are present, the complex phase parameter can be absorbed into redefinitions of the fermion fields.

A popular rephasing invariant whose vanishing signals absence of CP violation and occurs in most CP violating amplitudes is the  Jarlskog invariant: 

for quarks, which is  times the maximum value of  For leptons, only an upper limit exists: 

The reason why such a complex phase causes CP violation is not immediately obvious, but can be seen as follows. Before CP violation, these terms must be the same complex number. We can separate the magnitude and phase by writing  If a phase term is introduced from (e.g.) the CKM matrix, denote it  Note that  contains the conjugate matrix to  so it picks up a phase term  

Now the formula becomes:
 
 

Physically measurable reaction rates are proportional to  thus so far nothing is different.
 
 
Some further calculation gives:
 

Thus, we see that a complex phase gives rise to processes that proceed at different rates for particles and antiparticles, and CP is violated.

Thus, there are two necessary conditions for getting a complex CKM matrix:
 If both of them are complex,  and  mustn’t be the same, i.e., or CKM matrix will be an identity matrix, which is also  purely real.

Strong CP problem

There is no experimentally known violation of the CP-symmetry in quantum chromodynamics. As there is no known reason for it to be conserved in QCD specifically, this is a "fine tuning" problem known as the strong CP problem.

QCD does not violate the CP-symmetry as easily as the electroweak theory; unlike the electroweak theory in which the gauge fields couple to chiral currents constructed from the fermionic fields, the gluons couple to vector currents. Experiments do not indicate any CP violation in the QCD sector. For example, a generic CP violation in the strongly interacting sector would create the electric dipole moment of the neutron which would be comparable to 10−18 e·m while the experimental upper bound is roughly one trillionth that size.

This is a problem because at the end, there are natural terms in the QCD Lagrangian that are able to break the CP-symmetry.

For a nonzero choice of the θ angle and the chiral phase of the quark mass θ′ one expects the CP-symmetry to be violated. One usually assumes that the chiral quark mass phase can be converted to a contribution to the total effective  angle, but it remains to be explained why this angle is extremely small instead of being of order one; the particular value of the θ angle that must be very close to zero (in this case) is an example of a fine-tuning problem in physics, and is typically solved by physics beyond the Standard Model.

There are several proposed solutions to solve the strong CP problem. The most well-known is Peccei–Quinn theory, involving new scalar particles called axions. A newer, more radical approach not requiring the axion is a theory involving two time dimensions first proposed in 1998 by Bars, Deliduman, and Andreev.

Matter–antimatter imbalance

The non-dark matter universe is made chiefly of matter, rather than consisting of equal parts of matter and antimatter as might be expected. It can be demonstrated that, to create an imbalance in matter and antimatter from an initial condition of balance, the Sakharov conditions must be satisfied, one of which is the existence of CP violation during the extreme conditions of the first seconds after the Big Bang. Explanations which do not involve CP violation are less plausible, since they rely on the assumption that the matter–antimatter imbalance was present at the beginning, or on other admittedly exotic assumptions.

The Big Bang should have produced equal amounts of matter and antimatter if CP-symmetry was preserved; as such, there should have been total cancellation of both—protons should have cancelled with antiprotons, electrons with positrons, neutrons with antineutrons, and so on.  This would have resulted in a sea of radiation in the universe with no matter. Since this is not the case, after the Big Bang, physical laws must have acted differently for matter and antimatter, i.e. violating CP-symmetry.

The Standard Model contains at least three sources of CP violation. The first of these, involving the Cabibbo–Kobayashi–Maskawa matrix in the quark sector, has been observed experimentally and can only account for a small portion of the CP violation required to explain the matter-antimatter asymmetry. The strong interaction should also violate CP, in principle, but the failure to observe the electric dipole moment of the neutron in experiments suggests that any CP violation in the strong sector is also too small to account for the necessary CP violation in the early universe. The third source of CP violation is the Pontecorvo–Maki–Nakagawa–Sakata matrix in the lepton sector. The current long-baseline neutrino oscillation experiments, T2K and NOνA, may be able to find evidence of CP violation over a small fraction of possible values of the CP violating Dirac phase while the proposed next-generation experiments, Hyper-Kamiokande and DUNE, will be sensitive enough to definitively observe CP violation over a relatively large fraction of possible values of the Dirac phase. Further into the future, a neutrino factory could be sensitive to nearly all possible values of the CP violating Dirac phase. If neutrinos are Majorana fermions, the PMNS matrix could have two additional CP violating Majorana phases, leading to a fourth source of CP violation within the Standard Model. The experimental evidence for Majorana neutrinos would be the observation of neutrinoless double-beta decay. The best limits come from the GERDA experiment. CP violation in the lepton sector generates a matter-antimatter asymmetry through a process called leptogenesis. This could become the preferred explanation in the Standard Model for the matter-antimatter asymmetry of the universe if CP violation is experimentally confirmed in the lepton sector.

If CP violation in the lepton sector is experimentally determined to be too small to account for matter-antimatter asymmetry, some new physics beyond the Standard Model would be required to explain additional sources of CP violation. Adding new particles and/or interactions to the Standard Model generally introduces new sources of CP violation since CP is not a symmetry of nature.

Sakharov proposed a way to restore CP-symmetry using T-symmetry, extending spacetime before the Big Bang. He described complete CPT reflections of events on each side of what he called the "initial singularity". Because of this, phenomena with an opposite arrow of time at t < 0 would undergo an opposite CP violation, so the CP-symmetry would be preserved as a whole. The anomalous excess of matter over antimatter after the Big Bang in the orthochronous (or positive) sector, becomes an excess of antimatter before the Big Bang (antichronous or negative sector) as both charge conjugation, parity and arrow of time are reversed due to CPT reflections of all phenomena occurring over the initial singularity:

See also
B-factory

C-symmetry 
T-symmetry
CPT symmetry
BTeV experiment
Cabibbo–Kobayashi–Maskawa matrix
LHCb experiment
Penguin diagram
Neutral particle oscillation
Electron electric dipole moment

References

Further reading

 
 
  (A collection of essays introducing the subject, with an emphasis on experimental results.)
  (A compilation of reprints of numerous important papers on the topic, including papers by T.D. Lee, Cronin, Fitch, Kobayashi and Maskawa, and many others.)

 
 An elementary discussion of parity violation and CP violation is given in chapter 15 of this student level textbook

External links
 Cern Courier article

Quantum field theory
Asymmetry
Conservation laws
Particle physics
Physics beyond the Standard Model